Phocion Rossollin (22 December 1837 – 20 June 1911) was a French sailor who competed in the 1900 Summer Olympics in Meulan, France. Rossollin as helmsman, took the 11th place in first race of the 0.5 to 1 ton and finished 8th in the second race. He did this with the boat Ariette.

Further reading

References

External links

1837 births
1911 deaths
French male sailors (sport)
Sailors at the 1900 Summer Olympics – .5 to 1 ton
Olympic sailors of France
Sportspeople from Marseille
Sailors at the 1900 Summer Olympics – Open class